Pentapeptide may refer to:

 An oligopeptide formed from five amino acids
 Pentapeptide repeat